MSA Gunundaal was an auxiliary minesweeper operated by the Royal Australian Navy (RAN). Flamingo Bay was operated commercially as a fishing boat until she was acquired under the RAN's Craft of Opportunity Program for use as an auxiliary. Gunundaal was found to be unseaworthy in December 1992 and stricken.

References

Minesweepers of the Royal Australian Navy
Fishing ships of Australia